Dorothea Maunsell became Dorothea Kingsman after being Dorothea Tenducci (born 1750) was an Irish singer at the centre of a scandal after she married (and later divorced) an Italian castrato opera singer named Giusto Fernando Tenducci. She had children with her second husband.

Life
Maunsell was born in Dublin in about 1750. Her parents were Dorothy and Thomas Maunsell. Her father was a lawyer who became the member of parliament for Killmarnock in 1769 and he owned land in Waterford and Limerick. She has seven siblings and all the brothers did well and her sisters all married well - and then there was Dorothea.

Maunsell was brought up in Molesworth Street in Dublin. Tenducci was an opera star of the time who had given lessons to Mozart. He had been (illegally) castrated as a teenager to stop his voice from breaking during puberty.

Much of the detail of her life comes from a publication titled "The True and Genuine Narrative of Mr and Mrs Tenducci: in a Letter to a Friend at Bath" which was published in 1768. According to this she had music lessons from  Giusto Fernando Tenducci. During the lessons she had a "tender affection" for him although he was fifteen years older than her. Her father was keen to marry her to a man her had chosen and Maunsell realised that Tenducci was a possible alternative.

Although a castrato, Tenducci married 15-year-old Dorothea Maunsell secretly in 1766. The marriage was repeated in July 1767 with a license granted by the Bishop of Waterford and Lismore. In 1772, those marriages was later annulled on the grounds of non-consummation or impotence, which was one of the few grounds that women could use to sue for divorce. However,  Giacomo Casanova claimed in his autobiography that Dorothea gave birth to two children. His subsequent biographer Helen Berry was unable to corroborate this claim and suggests that they may have been the children of Dorothea's second husband, Robert Long Kingsman.

Death and legacy
Maunsell moved to Kingsclere, Hampshire with her second husband and had four children with him there. She died aged 63 in Grosvenor Place, London and was buried at St George Hanover Square 21 February 1814. In 2012 Helen Berry wrote a fictionalised biography of her life in "The Castrato and his Wife".

References

1750 births
Singers from Dublin (city)
Irish opera singers
Year of death unknown